Darcia Leimgruber (born 19 May 1989) is a Swiss female ice hockey player. She is a member of the Switzerland women's national ice hockey team. She played in the 2010 Winter Olympics. She also played also for ZSC Lions Zurich in the Leistungsklasse A, the top women's ice hockey league in Switzerland.

Playing career

Switzerland
Leimgruber played hockey at Middle Economy School/DHC Langenthal under coach Hans Brechbühler. She earned a gold medal with DHC Langenthal at the Swiss Championships in 2007–08 and a silver medal at the Swiss Championships in 2008–09. She played for the fourth place Swiss team at the World Women's Championship in China. In addition, she was voted one of the most valuable players of the World Women's Championship in Finland. In a game versus Russia at the 2012 IIHF Women's World Championship, Leimgruber logged an assist in a 5–2 victory, as Switzerland advanced to the semifinals.

Maine
Leimgruber has appeared in six games for the Black Bears, scoring her first collegiate goal at Union College on Dec. 11, 2009. She also has recorded an assist to go along with her goal for a total of two points on the season.

Career stats

Maine

Olympics

Awards and honors

References

1989 births
Ice hockey players at the 2010 Winter Olympics
Living people
Olympic ice hockey players of Switzerland
Swiss women's ice hockey forwards
Maine Black Bears women's ice hockey players